Old Believers or Old Ritualists are Eastern Orthodox Christians who maintain the liturgical and ritual practices of the Russian Orthodox Church as they were before the reforms of Patriarch Nikon of Moscow between 1652 and 1666. Resisting the accommodation of Russian piety to the contemporary forms of Greek Orthodox worship, these Christians were anathematized, together with their ritual, in a Synod of 1666–67, producing a division in Eastern Europe between the Old Believers and those who followed the state church in its condemnation of the Old Rite. Russian speakers refer to the schism itself as raskol, etymologically indicating a "cleaving-apart".

Introduction 

In 1652, Nikon of Moscow, patriarch of the Russian Orthodox Church from then until 1658, introduced a number of ritual and textual revisions with the aim of achieving uniformity between the practices of the Russian and Greek Orthodox churches. Nikon, having noticed discrepancies between Russian and Greek rites and texts, ordered an adjustment of the Russian rites to align with the Greek ones of his time. In doing so, according to the Old Believers, Nikon acted without adequate consultation with the clergy and without gathering a council. After the implementation of these revisions, the Church anathematized and suppressed—with the support of Muscovite state power—the prior liturgical rite itself, as well as those who were reluctant to pass to the revised rite.

Those who maintained fidelity to the existing rite endured severe persecutions from the end of the 17th century until the beginning of the 20th century as "Schismatics" (raskol'niki). They became known as "Old Ritualists", a name introduced under the empress Catherine the Great who reigned from 1762 to 1796. Those who adopted new liturgical practices started to call themselves pravoslavnye (Православные - those believing rightly).

Prior to Nikon
The installation of a Metropolitan of Kiev and All Russia, but resident in Moscow, by a council of Russian bishops in 1448 without consent from the Ecumenical Patriarch of Constantinople initiated the effective independence of the Eastern Orthodox Church in the Grand Duchy of Moscow. By then, apart from Muslim and Jewish minorities and pagan subject peoples, the Russian people were Christianised, observing church festivals and marking births, marriages, and deaths with Orthodox rituals. However, many popular religious practices were of pagan origin or marked by superstition, disorder, or drunkenness.

The main objectives of reformers in the 16th century, many from the secular clergy, were to outlaw pagan rituals and beliefs and to standardise the liturgy throughout the Muscovite realm. This resulted in the holding of the Stoglavy Synod, a Russian church council in 1551, whose decrees formed the basis of Orthodox ritual and liturgy in the late 16th and early 17th centuries. This synod condemned many popular religious practices; among other things, it forbade the practice of polyphony. In addition, while stressing the need for accurate copying of sacred documents, it also approved of traditional Russian liturgical practices that differed from contemporary Greek ones.

Origins of reform
During the reign of Aleksei Mikhailovich (r. 1645–1676), the young tsar and his confessor, Stefan Vonifatiev, sponsored a group, mainly composed of non-monastic clergy and known as the Zealots of Piety. These included the archpriest Avvakum as a founder-member, as well as the future patriarch Nikon, who joined in 1649. Their original aim was to revitalise the parishes through effective preaching, the orderly celebration of the liturgy, and enforcement of the church's moral teachings. To ensure that the liturgy was celebrated correctly, its original and authentic form had to be established, but the way that Nikon did this caused disputes between him and other reformers.

In 1646, Nikon first met Tsar Aleksei who immediately appointed him archimandrite of the Novospassky monastery in Moscow. In 1649, Nikon was consecrated as the Metropolitan of Novgorod and, in 1652, he became Patriarch of Moscow. During his time in Novgorod, Nikon began to develop his view that the responsibility for the spiritual health of Russia lay with senior church leaders, not the tsar. When he became patriarch, he started to reorganise the church's administration so it was wholly under his own control.

In 1649, a Greek delegation, headed by Patriarch Paisios of Jerusalem, arrived in Moscow and tried to convince the tsar and Nikon that current Greek liturgical practices were authentically Orthodox and that Russian usages that differed from them were local innovations. This led to a heated debate between the visiting Greeks and many Russian clerics who believed that, by accepting the decrees of the Council of Florence, the Greek patriarchate had compromised its authority and forfeited any right to dictate to Russia on liturgical matters. 
Tsar Aleksei, Nikon and some of the Zealots of Piety decided that best way to revitalise the Russian church was to conform with the usages of the Greek church and accept the authority of the Patriarch of Constantinople.

Reforms of Nikon 

By the middle of the 17th century, Greek and Russian Church officials, including Patriarch Nikon of Moscow, had noticed discrepancies between contemporary Russian and Greek usages. They reached the conclusion that the Russian Orthodox Church had, as a result of errors of incompetent copyists, developed rites and liturgical books of its own that had significantly deviated from the Greek originals. Thus, the Russian Orthodox Church had become dissonant with the other Orthodox churches.

The unrevised Muscovite service-books derived from a different, and older, Greek recension than that which was used in the current Greek books, which had been revised over the centuries, and contained innovations. Nikon wanted to have the same rite in the Russian tsardom as those ethnically Slavic lands, then the territories of Ukraine and Belarus, that were then part of Polish–Lithuanian Commonwealth, to attract local Orthodox rebels. Their rite was closer to the Greek than that in the Muscovite realm. Nikon did not accept the existence of two different rites in the same church.

Supported by Tsar Aleksei, Nikon carried out some preliminary liturgical reforms. In 1652, he convened a synod and exhorted the clergy on the need to compare Russian Typikon, Euchologion, and other liturgical books with their Greek counterparts. Monasteries from all over Russia received requests to send examples to Moscow to have them subjected to a comparative analysis. Such a task would have taken many years of conscientious research and could hardly have given an unambiguous result, given the complex development of the Russian liturgical texts over the previous centuries and the lack of textual historiographic techniques at the time.

Without waiting for the completion of any comparative analysis, Nikon overrode the decrees of the Stoglavy Synod and ordered the printing of new editions of the Russian psalter, missal, and a pamphlet justifying his liturgical changes. The new psalter and missal altered the most frequently used words and visible gestures in the liturgy, including the pronunciation of Christ's name and making the sign of the cross. In addition, the overbearing manner in which he forced the changes through turned Avvakum and others of the Zealots of Piety against him. Their protests led to their excommunication and exile and, in some cases, imprisonment or execution.

It was not disputed by the reformers that the Russian texts should be corrected by reference to the most ancient Greek, but also Slavonic, manuscripts, although they also considered that many traditional Russian ceremonial practices were acceptable. In addition, the hastily published new editions of the service books contained internal inconsistencies, and had to be reprinted several times in quick succession. Rather than being revised according to ancient Slavonic and Greek manuscripts, the new liturgical editions had actually been translated from modern Greek editions printed in Catholic Venice.

The locum tenens for Patriarch Pitirim of Moscow convened the 1666 Great Moscow Synod, which brought Patriarch Macarius III Ibn al-Za'im of Antioch, Patriarch Paisios of Alexandria, and many bishops to Moscow. Some scholars allege that the visiting patriarchs each received both 20,000 rubles in gold and furs for their participation. This council officially established the reforms and anathematized not only all those opposing the innovations but the old Russian books and rites themselves as well. As a side-effect of condemning the past of the Russian Orthodox Church and her traditions, the innovations appeared to weaken the messianic theory depicting Moscow as the Third Rome. Instead of the guardian of Orthodox faith, Moscow seemed an accumulation of serious liturgical mistakes.

It is argued that changing the wording of the eighth article of the Nicaean Creed was one of the very few alterations that could be seen as a genuine correction, rather than aligning the texts of Russian liturgical books and practices, customs and even vestments with the Greek versions that Nikon considered were universally applicable norms. Nikon also attacked Russian Church rituals as erroneous, and even in some cases heretical, in comparison with their contemporary Greek equivalents. This went beyond the recommendation of Patriarch Paisios of Jerusalem, who suggested that differences in ritual did not of themselves indicate error, accepting the possibility that differences have developed over time. He urged Nikon to use discretion in attempting to enforce complete uniformity with Greek practice.

Nevertheless, both patriarch and tsar wished to carry out their reforms, although their endeavors may have had as much or more political motivation as religious; several authors on this subject point out that Tsar Aleksei, encouraged by his military success in the Russo-Polish War (1654–1667) to conquer West Russian provinces and Ukraine, developed ambitions of becoming the liberator of the Orthodox areas which at that time formed part of the Ottoman Empire. They also mention the role of the Near-East patriarchs, who actively supported the idea of the Russian Tsar becoming the liberator of all Orthodox Christians and who suggested that Patriarch Nikon might become the new Patriarch of Constantinople.

Main alterations 
The numerous changes in both texts and rites occupied approximately 400 pages. Old Believers present the following as the most crucial changes:

Today's readers might perceive these alterations as trivial, but the faithful of that time saw rituals and dogmas as strongly interconnected: church rituals had from the beginning represented and symbolized doctrinal truth. The authorities imposed the reforms in an autocratic fashion, with no consultation of the subject people. Those who reacted against the Nikonite reforms would have objected as much to the manner of imposition as to the alterations. Changes were also often made arbitrarily in the texts. For example, wherever the books read 'Христосъ' [Christ], Nikon's assistants substituted 'Сынъ' [meaning the Son], and wherever they read 'Сынъ' they substituted 'Христосъ'. Another example is that wherever the books read 'Церковь' [meaning Church], Nikon substituted 'Храмъ' [meaning Temple] and vice versa.

According to a source sympathetic to the Old Believers:

Schism 

Opponents of the ecclesiastical reforms of Nikon emerged among all strata of the people and in relatively large numbers (see Raskol). However, after the deposition of Patriarch Nikon (1658), who presented too strong a challenge to the tsar's authority, a series of church councils officially endorsed Nikon's liturgical reforms. The Old Believers fiercely rejected all innovations, and the most radical among them maintained that the official Church had fallen into the hands of the Antichrist. The Old Believers, under the leadership of Archpriest Avvakum Petrov (1620 or 1621 to 1682), publicly denounced and rejected all ecclesiastical reforms. The State church anathematized both the old rites and books and those who wished to stay loyal to them at the synod of 1666. From that moment, the Old Believers officially lacked all civil rights. The State had the most active Old Believers arrested, and executed several of them (including Archpriest Avvakum) some years later in 1682.

After the schism 

After 1685, a period of persecutions began, including both torture and executions. Many Old Believers fled Russia altogether, particularly for the Grand Duchy of Lithuania, where the community exists to this day. Old Believers became the dominant denomination in many regions, including the Pomors of the Russian Far North, in the Kursk region, in the Ural Mountains, in Siberia, and the Russian Far East. The 40,000-strong community of Lipovans still lives in Kiliya Raion (Vylkove) of Ukraine and Tulcea County of Romania in the Danube Delta. In the Imperial Russian census of 1897, 2,204,596 people, about 1.75% of the population of the Russian Empire self-declared as Old Believers or other denominations split from the Russian Orthodox Church. By the 1910s, in the last Imperial Russian census just before the October Revolution, approximately ten percent of the population of the Russian Empire said that they belonged to one of the Old Believer branches (census data).

Government oppression could vary from relatively moderate, as under Peter the Great (reigned 1682–1725) (Old Believers had to pay double taxation and a separate tax for wearing a beard)—to intense, as under Tsar Nicholas I (reigned 1825–1855). The Russian synodal state church and the state authorities often saw Old Believers as dangerous elements and as a threat to the Russian state.

In 1762, Catherine the Great passed an act that allowed Old Believers to practise their faith openly without interference. In 1905, Tsar Nicholas II signed an act of religious freedom that ended the persecution of all religious minorities in Russia. The Old Believers gained the right to build churches, to ring church bells, to hold processions and to organize themselves. It became prohibited (as under Catherine the Great—reigned 1762–1796) to refer to Old Believers as raskolniki (schismatics), a name they consider insulting. People often refer to the period from 1905 until 1917 as "the Golden Age of the Old Faith". One can regard the Act of 1905 as emancipating the Old Believers, who had until then occupied an almost illegal position in Russian society. Nevertheless, some restrictions for Old Believers continued: for example, they were forbidden from joining the civil service.

Old Believer denominations 
Although all Old Believers groups emerged as a result of opposition to the Nikonite reform, they do not constitute a single monolithic body. Despite the emphasis on invariable adherence to the pre-Nikonite traditions, the Old Believers feature a great diversity of groups that profess different interpretations of the church tradition and often are not in communion with each other (some groups even practice re-baptism before admitting a member of another group into their midst).

Since none of the bishops joined the Old Believers (except Bishop Pavel of Kolomna, who was put to death for this), apostolically ordained priests of the old rite would have soon become extinct. Two responses appeared to this dilemma: the Popovtsy (поповцы, "with priests") and the Bezpopovtsy ("priestless").

Priested (Popovtsy) 

The Popovtsy represented the more moderate conservative opposition, those who strove to continue religious and church life as it had existed before the reforms of Nikon. They recognized ordained priests from the new-style Russian Orthodox church who joined the Old Believers and who had denounced the Nikonite reforms. In 1846, they convinced Ambrose of Belaya Krinitsa (1791–1863), a Greek Orthodox bishop whom Turkish pressure had removed from his see at Sarajevo, to become an Old Believer and to consecrate three Russian Old Believer priests as bishops. In 1859, the number of Old Believer bishops in Russia reached ten and they established their own episcopate, the Belokrinitskaya Hierarchy.

Not all popovtsy Old Believers recognized this hierarchy. Dissenters known as beglopopovtsy obtained their own hierarchy in the 1920s. The priestist Old Believers thus manifest as two churches which share the same beliefs, but which treat each other's hierarchy as illegitimate. Popovtsy have priests, bishops and all sacraments, including the Eucharist.

 Belokrinitskaya Hierarchy—The largest popovtsy denomination. One can refer to the Russian part of this denomination as the Belokrinitskoe Soglasie (the "Belokrinitsky Agreement") or as the Russian Orthodox Old-Rite Church. The Old Rite community founded at Rogozhskoye Cemetery played a major role in the creation of the denomination and remains as the seat of the Metropolitan of Moscow and All Russia.
 Neokruzhniki (extinct)
 Novozybkovskaya hierarchy or Russian Old-Orthodox Church
 Nekrasov Cossacks, Nekrasovtsy
 Beglopopovtsy (extinct, now the Russian Old-Orthodox Church)
 Luzhkane, also known as Luzhkovskoe soglasie; in some places, they had no priests and so belonged to the Bezpopovtsy (extinct)
 There have also been Old Believer members, like Fr. Potapy Emelianov, of the Russian Catholic Church united with the Holy See, who would also be classed as popovtsy

Priestless (Bezpopovtsy) 

The Bezpopovtsy rejected "the World" where they believed the Antichrist reigned; they preached the imminent end of the world, asceticism, adherence to the old rituals and the old faith. More radical movements which already existed prior to the reforms of Nikon and where eschatological and anti-clerical sentiments were predominant, would join the bezpopovtsy Old Believers. The Bezpopovtsy claimed that any priest or ordinary who has ever used the Nikonite Rites have forfeited apostolic succession. Therefore, the true church of Christ had ceased to exist on Earth, and they therefore renounced priests and all sacraments except baptism.

The Bezpopovtsy movement has many sub-groups. Bezpopovtsy have no priests and no Eucharist. Priestless churches, however, may elect a mentor or church leader to lead the community and its services.

 Pomorian Old-Orthodox Church or Danilovtsy (not to be confused with Pomors) originated in North Russia (East Karelia, Arkhangelsk Oblast). Initially they rejected marriage and prayer for the Tsar.
 Novopomortsy, or "New Pomortsy": accept marriage
 Staropomortsy, or "Old Pomortsy": reject marriage
 Fedoseevtsy: "Society of Christian Old Believers of the Old Pomortsy Unmarried Confession" (1690s until present); deny marriage and practice cloister-style asceticism.
 Filippians: Named after their founder, Filipp. They were repressed by the Russian Government and so, the Fillipovtsy started practicing self-immolation as a means for the "preservation of the faith". 
 Chasovennye (from chasovnya i.e. chapel), a Siberian branch. The Chasovennye initially had priests, but later decided to change to a priest-less practice. Also known as Semeyskie (in the lands east of Lake Baikal).

Minor groups
Apart from these major groups, many smaller groups have emerged and became extinct at various times since the end of the 17th century:

 Aristovtsy (beginning of the 19th to the beginning of the 20th centuries; extinct): from the name of the merchant Aristov;
 Titlovtsy (extinct in the twentieth century): emerged from Fedoseevtsy, supported the use of the inscription "INRI" (titlo) upon the Orthodox cross, which other groups rejected;
 Troparion confession (troparschiki): a group that commemorated the tsar in the hymns (troparia);
 Daniel's confession of the "partially married" (danilovtsy polubrachnye);
 Adamant confession (adamantovy): refused to use money and passports (as containing the seal of Antichrist);
 Aaron's confession (aaronovtsy): second half of the 18th century, a spin-off of the Fillipovtsy.
 "Grandmother's confession" or the Self-baptized: practiced self-baptism or the baptism by midwives (babushki), since a valid priesthood—in their opinion—had ceased to exist;
 "Hole-worshippers" (dyrniki): relinquished the use of icons and prayed to the East through a hole in the wall;
 Melchisedecs (in Moscow and in Bashkortostan): practised a peculiar lay "quasi-Eucharistic" rite;
 "Runaways" (beguny) or "Wanderers" (stranniki);
 "Netovtsy" or Saviour's Confession: denied the possibility of celebrating sacraments and praying in churches; the name comes from the Russian net "no", since they have "no" sacraments, "no" churches, "no" priests, etc.

Edinovertsy

Edinovertsy (i.e. "people of the same faith"; collective, единоверчество; often referred to as Orthodox Old Ritualists, православные старообрядцы): Agreed to become a part of the official Russian Orthodox Church while saving the old rites. First appearing in 1800, the Edinovertsy come under the omophorion of the Russian Orthodox Church of the Moscow Patriarchate – Russian Orthodox Church Outside Russia, abbreviated as ROCOR – have come into communion under different circumstances and retain being old believers in the traditional context and retain the use of the pre-Nikonite rituals. Alexander Dugin, sociologist and a former strategic adviser to Vladimir Putin, is a proponent of edinoverie, since it combines Apostolic succession of the ROC, while preserving pre-Nikonite liturgical tradition.

Validity of the reformist theory 
Vladimir officially converted the Eastern Slavs to Christianity in 988, and the people had adopted Greek Orthodox liturgical practices. At the end of the 11th century, the efforts of St. Theodosius of the Caves in Kiev (Феодосий Киево-Печерский, d. 1074) introduced the so-called Studite Typicon to Russia.  This typicon (essentially, a guide-book for liturgical and monastic life) reflected the traditions of the urban Monastery of Stoudios in Constantinople. The Studite typicon predominated throughout the western part of the Byzantine Empire and was accepted throughout the Russian lands. At the end of the 14th century, through the work of Cyprian, metropolitan of Moscow and Kiev, the Studite liturgical practices were gradually replaced in Russia with the so-called Jerusalem Typicon or the Typicon of St. Sabbas—originally, an adaptation of the Studite liturgy to the customs of Palestinian monasteries. The process of gradual change of typica would continue throughout the 15th century and, because of its slow implementation, met with little resistance—unlike Nikon's reforms, conducted with abruptness and violence. However, in the course of the 15th—17th centuries, Russian scribes continued to insert some Studite material into the general shape of Jerusalem Typicon. This explains the differences between the modern version of the Typicon, used by the Russian Orthodox Church, and the pre-Nikonite Russian recension of Jerusalem Typicon, called Oko Tserkovnoe (Rus. "eye of the church"). This pre-Nikonite version, based on the Moscow printed editions of 1610, 1633 and 1641, continues to be used by modern Old Believers.

However, in the course of the polemics against Old Believers, the official Russian Orthodox Church often claimed the discrepancies (which emerged in the texts between the Russian and the Greek churches) as Russian innovations, errors, or arbitrary translations. This charge of "Russian innovation" re-appeared repeatedly in the textbooks and anti-raskol treatises and catecheses, including, for example, those by Dimitry of Rostov.

The critical evaluation of the sources and of the essence of the church reforms began only in the 1850s, with the groundbreaking work of several church historians, Byzantinists, and theologians, including S. A. Belokurov, A. P. Shchapov, A. K. Borozdin, N. Gibbenet and, later, E. E. Golubinsky, A. V. Kartashev, A. A. Dmitriyevsky, and Nikolai F. Kapterev (the last four were members of the Imperial Academy of Sciences).  Research was continued later mainly by Serge A. Zenkovsky, a specialist on Russian ecclesiastical culture. Golubinsky, Dmitriyevsky, Kartashov and Kapterev, amongst others, demonstrated that the rites, rejected and condemned by the church reforms, were genuine traditions of Orthodox Christianity, altered in Greek usage during the 15th–16th centuries but remaining unchanged in Russia.  The pre-Nikonite liturgical practices, including some elements of the Russian typicon Oko Tserkovnoe, were demonstrated to have preserved earlier Byzantine practices, being closer to the earlier Byzantine texts than some later Greek customs.

Remarkably, the scholars who opened the new avenues for re-evaluation of the reform by the Russian Church themselves held membership in the official church (A. V. Kapterev, for instance, was a professor at the Slavic Greek Latin Academy) but nevertheless took up serious study of the causes and background of the reforms and of the resulting schism.  Their research revealed that the official explanation regarding the old Russian books and rites was unsustainable.

Background 

As Serge A. Zenkovsky points out in his standard work Russia's Old Believers, the Old Believer schism did not occur simply as a result of a few individuals with power and influence. The schism had complex causes, revealing historical processes and circumstances in 17th-century Russian society. Those who broke from the hierarchy of the official State Church had quite divergent views on church, faith, society, state power and social issues. Thus the collective term "Old Believers" groups together various movements within Russian society which actually had existed long before 1666–67. They shared a distrust of state power and of the episcopate, insisting upon the right of the people to arrange their own spiritual life, and expressing the ambition to aim for such control.

Both the popovtsy and bespopovtsy, although theologically and psychologically two different teachings, manifested spiritual, eschatological and mystical tendencies throughout Russian religious thought and church life. One can also emphasize the schism's position in the political and cultural background of its time: increasing Western influence, secularization, and attempts to subordinate the Church to the state. Nevertheless, the Old Believers sought above all to defend and preserve the purity of the Orthodox faith, embodied in the old rituals, which inspired many to strive against Patriarch Nikon's church reforms even unto death.

In the past the Old Believers' movement was often perceived as an obscure faith in rituals that led to the deaths of tens of thousands of ignorant people. Old Believers were accused of not being able to distinguish the important from the unimportant. To many people of that time, however, rituals expressed the very essence of their faith. Old Believers hold that the preservation of a certain "microclimate" that enables the salvation of one's soul requires not only living by the commandments of Christ, but also carefully preserving Church tradition, which contains the spiritual power and knowledge of past centuries, embodied in external forms.

The Old Believers reject the idea of contents a priori prevailing over form. To illustrate this issue, the renowned Russian historian Vasily Klyuchevsky (1841–1911) referred to poetry. He argued, that if one converts a poem into prose, the contents of the poem may remain intact, but the poem will lose its charm and emotional impact; moreover, the poem will essentially no longer exist. In the case of religious rituals, form and contents do not just form two separable, autonomous entities, but connect with each other through complex relationships, including theological, psychological, phenomenal, aesthetic and historic dimensions.

These aspects, in their turn, play a role in the perception of these rituals by the faithful and in their spiritual lives. Considering the fact that Church rituals from their very beginning were intertwined with doctrinal truth, changing these rituals may have a tremendous effect on religious conscience and a severe impact on the faithful.

Nevertheless, centuries of persecution and the nature of their origin have made some Old Believers culturally conservative. Some Old Believers consider any pre-Nikonite Orthodox Russian practice or artifact as exclusively theirs, denying that the Russian Orthodox Church has any claims upon a history before Patriarch Nikon.

However, Russian economic history of the late 19th and early 20th centuries reveals the Old-Believer merchant families as more flexible and more open to innovations while creating factories and starting the first Russian industries.

Main differences 

 Old Believers use two fingers while making the Sign of the Cross (the pointer finger straight, middle finger slightly bent) while new-style Orthodoxy uses two fingers and the thumb for the sign of cross (the thumb and two fingers are held together at point, two fingers folded). Old Ritualists generally say the Jesus Prayer with the Sign of the Cross, while New Ritualists use the Sign of the Cross as a Trinitarian symbol. This makes for a significant difference between the two branches of Russian Orthodoxy, and one of the most noticeable (see the picture of Boyarynya Feodosia Morozova above). A prayer rug known as the Podruchnik is used to keep one's face and hands clean during prostrations, as these parts of the body are used to make the sign of the cross on oneself.
 Old Believers reject any changes and emendations of liturgical texts and rituals introduced by the reforms of Patriarch Nikon. Thus they continue to use the previous Church Slavonic translation of the Greek texts, including the Psalter, striving to preserve intact the "pre-Nikonite" practices of the Russian Church.
 Old Believers only recognize performing baptism through three full immersions, in agreement with the Greek practice, but reject the validity of any baptismal rite performed otherwise (for example through pouring or sprinkling, as the Russian Orthodox Church has occasionally accepted since the 18th century). (See Oblivantsy)
 Old Believers perform the Liturgy with seven prosphora, instead of five as in new-rite Russian Orthodoxy or a single large prosphoron, as sometimes done by the Greeks and Arabs.
 Old Believers chant the alleluia verse after the psalmody twice rather than the three times mandated by the Nikonite reforms.
 Old Believers do not use polyphonic singing as the new-style Russian practice, but only the monodic, unison singing of Znamenny chant. In this respect it represents a tradition that parallels the use of Byzantine chant and neumatic notation.

Present situation 

In 1971, the Moscow Patriarchate revoked the anathemas imposed on the Old Believers in the 17th century. In 1974, the Russian Orthodox Church Outside Russia issued an ukase revoking the anathemas, asking forgiveness from the Old Believers. Under their auspices, the first efforts to make the prayer and service books of the Old Believers available in English were made. Nevertheless, most Old Believer communities have not returned to full communion with the majority of Orthodox Christianity worldwide.

Estimates place the total number of Old Believers remaining as of 2006 as being between 1 and 2 million, some living in extremely isolated communities in places to which they fled centuries ago to avoid persecution. Part of one Old Believer parish in the United States, in Erie, Pennsylvania, has entered into communion with the Russian Orthodox Church Outside Russia, after a split in the congregation. The remainder have continued as Old Believers.

Old Believer churches in Russia  have started restoration of their property, although Old Believers face many difficulties in claiming their restitution rights for their churches. Moscow has churches for all the most important Old Believer branches: Rogozhskaya Zastava (Popovtsy of the Belokrinitskaya hierarchy official center), a cathedral for the Novozybkovskaya hierarchy in Zamoskvorech'ye and Preobrazhenskaya Zastava where Pomortsy and Fedoseevtsy coexist.

Within the Old Believer world, only Pomortsy and Fedoseevtsy treat each other relatively well; none of the other denominations acknowledge each other. Ordinary Old Believers display some tendencies of inter-branch ecumenism, but these trends find sparse support among the official leaders of the congregations.

Modern-day Old Believers live all over the world, having fled Russia under tsarist persecution and after the Russian Revolution of 1917. Some Old Believers are still transient throughout various parts of the world today. Significant established Old Believer communities exist in the United States and Canada in Plamondon, Alberta; Hines Creek, Alberta; Woodburn, Oregon; Erie, Pennsylvania; Erskine, Minnesota and in various parts of Alaska including near Homer in the Fox River area villages of Voznesenka, Razdolna, and Kachemak Selo, Nikolaevsk, Beryozovka, Delta Junction, and Kodiak, Alaska (Larsen Bay area, and on Raspberry Island). Two communities also exist in Sydney, Australia and in the South Island of New Zealand. A large community existed in Yarwun, Australia, for many years until many families left the area in the early 2000s.  Communities also have been established in many parts of South America, including Brazil, Uruguay, Bolivia and Argentina, where they moved after having found refuge in China between the 1920s and the 1950s.

Old Believer communities are also found in Georgia and Kazakhstan.

Small hidden communities have been found in the Russian Far North (specifically remote areas of Arkhangelsk Oblast and the Komi Republic) and various regions of Siberia, especially concentrated in the areas between the Altai Mountains  and Tuva Republic. Perhaps the highest concentration of older established Old Believer communities, with foundations dating back hundreds of years, can be found concentrated in Eastern Siberia, specifically the Transbaikal region in desolate areas of Buryatia and Zabaykalsky Krai.  Others, like the Lykov family, fled later into the wild to avoid Communist persecution.

The Lipovans, who live in Romania's Danube Delta, are descendants of the Old Believers who left Russia in around 1740 to avoid religious persecutions.

A conservative estimate for the Old Believer population in Bolivia stands at some 3,000, while that in Alaska is estimated at 2,500. Old Believers arrived in Alaska, US, in the second half of the 20th century, helping to revive a shrinking Orthodox population.

Old Believers from Russia fled to Swedish Estonia and Livonia in the end of the 17th century. Currently, there are 2,605 Old Believers in Estonia according to the 2011 census. They live mostly in villages from Mustvee to Omedu and from Nina to Varnja on the western coast of Lake Peipus, and on Piirissaar Island. Their proximity to Lake Peipus gives them their name peipsivenelased ("Peipus Russians") in Estonian.

Two Old Believer missions have been established in Pakistan and Uganda.

Old Believer churches
 Lipovan Orthodox Old-Rite Church (Belokrinitskaya Hierarchy, Lipovans)
  (Fedoseevtsy)
 Pomorian Old-Orthodox Church (Pomortsy)
 Pomorian Old-Orthodox Church of Lithuania
 Union of Old Believer Parishes in Estonia
 Russian Old-Orthodox Church (Novozybkovskaya Hierarchy)
 Russian Orthodox Old-Rite Church (Belokrinitskaya Hierarchy)

See also

 Ancient Church of the East — an East Syriac Church, founded in 1968 over similar reasons to split off from Assyrian Church of the East
 Confessing Movement
 Continuing Anglican movement
 Independent Catholic
 Khovanshchina
 Lykov family
 Old Believers (Latvia)
 Sedevacantism
 Traditionalist Catholic
 True Orthodoxy — a denominational movement within Eastern Orthodox Church over differences such as ecumenism and Calendar reforms since the early 20th century

References

Sources

In English
 Cherniavsky, M.: "The Reception of the Council of Florence in Moscow", Church History XXIV (1955), 147–57.
 Shevchenko I., "Ideological Repercussions of the Council of Florence", Church History XXIV (1955), 291–323.
 Crummey, Robert O.: The Old Believers & The World Of Antichrist; The Vyg Community & The Russian State, Wisconsin U.P., 1970
 Crummey, Robert O.: Eastern Orthodoxy in Russia and Ukraine in the age of the Counter-Reformation in The Cambridge History of Christianity Vol.5, Eastern Christianity, Cambridge University Press, 2008 
 De Simone, Peter T.: The Old Believers in Imperial Russia:  Oppression, Opportunism and Religious Identity in Tsarist Moscow, I. B. Tauris, 2018 ISBN 978-1784538927
 Gill, T.: The Council of Florence, Cambridge, 1959
 MacCulloch, Diarmaid, A History of Christianity, 2009, Penguin 2010 , chapter 15
 .
Pokrovsii. N.N.  “Western Siberian Scriptoria and Binderies: Ancient Traditions Among the Old Believers.” The Book Collector 20 (Spring 1971): 19-32.
 Rock, S., Russian piety and Orthodox culture 1380–1589 in The Cambridge History of Christianity Vol.5, Eastern Christianity, Cambridge University University Press, 2008 
Smith, Abby, and Vladimir Budaragin. Living Traditions of Russian Faith: Books & Manuscripts of the Old Believers : an Exhibition at the Library of Congress, May 31 – June 29, 1990. Washington: Library of Congress, 1990.
 Zenkovsky, Serge A.: "The ideology of the Denisov brothers", Harvard Slavic Studies, 1957. III, 49–66
 .
 .
 .
 Stefanie Scherr, 2013 : "'As soon as we got here we lost everything': the migration memories and religious lives of the old believers in Australia | 'As soon as we got here we lost everything': the migration memories and religious lives of the old believers in Australia

Further reading
 Old Orthodox Prayer Book. Trans. and ed. by Pimen Simon, Theodore Jurewics, [and] German Ciuba. Erie, Penn.: Russian Orthodox Church of the Nativity of Christ (Old Rite), 1986. N.B.: Consists of the liturgy of the Old Believers (a.k.a. Old Ritualists), as also now authorized for use in parishes of the canonical Russian Orthodox Church; texts in Russian and English on facing pages. Without ISBN

In Russian
 Голубинский ЕЕ: История русской церкви, Москва, 1900 / Golubinskij EE: "History of the Russian Church", Moscow, 1900
  / "Contribution to our polemic with the Old believers", ČOIDR, 1905
  / Dmitrievskij A.A.: The correction of books under Patriarch Nikon and Patriarchs after him. Moscow, "Jazyki slavjanskoj kul'tury", 2004
 Зеньковский С.А.: Русское старообрядчество, том I и II, Москва 2006 / Zenkovsky S.A.: "Russia's Old Believers", volumes I and II, Moscow 2006
 Каптерев Н.Ф.: Патриарх Никон и его противники в деле исправления церковныx обрядов, Москва, 1913 / Kapterv N.F.: "Patriarch Nikon and his opponents in the correction of church rituals", Moscow, 1913
  / Kapterev N.F.: "Character of the relationships between Russia and the orthodox East in the 16th and 17th centuries", Moscow, 1914
 Карташов А.В.: Очерки по истории русской церкви, Париж, 1959 / Kartašov A.V.: "Outlines of the history of the Russian church", Paris, 1959
 Ключевский И.П.: Сочинения, I–VIII, Москва, 1956–1959 / Ključevskij I.P.: "Works", I–VIII, Moscow, 1956–1959
 Мельников Ф.И.: Краткая история древлеправославной (старообрядческой) церкви. Барнаул, 1999 / Melnikov F.I.: "Short history of the Old orthodox (Old ritualist) Church", Barnaul, 1999
 Урушев Д.А. Возьми крест свой: история старообрядчества в событиях и лицах. Барнаул, 2009. / Urushev D.A. Take up your Cross: most influential persons and events in the history of Old Belief, Barnaul, 2009

N.B.: All these works come from scholars and scientists, none of them Old Believers, except for Melnikov (an Old-Believer apologist) and Urushev (a religious historian).

External links

Russian Orthodox Old-Rite Church (in Russian)
Pomorian Old-Orthodox Church of Lithuania (in Russian)
Old Believers in North America — a bibliography

 
17th-century establishments in Russia
Christian denominations established in the 17th century
 
History of the Russian Orthodox Church
17th-century Eastern Orthodoxy